The Gentle People were a band formed in the United States in 1995 by a multinational group of musicians performing under the names Dougie Dimensional, Laurie LeMans, Valentine Carnelian, and Honeymink. Their sound explored kitschy 1950s lounge and easy listening aesthetics in the context of 1990s club culture. They signed to the UK electronic label Rephlex Records in 1995 and released two albums: Soundtracks for Living (1997) and Simply Faboo (1999).

Career
The members of the Gentle People come from the US, UK, and France. The group describe themselves as an "audio-visual experience" and labeled their sound "E-Z-Core." They were signed to Rephlex Records (co-run by Richard D. James a/k/a Aphex Twin), despite the group's "relaxed brand of sugar-coated, vocal-based easy listening" being quite different from the output on that electronic label. The signing occurred after they mailed a demo and postcard. The 1995 track "Journey" was their first release. The released the EP Emotion Heater in 1996.

The group released their 1997 debut album Soundtracks for Living on the label. The album mixed typical lounge sounds, including strings, harps, and Latin rhythms, with modern dub, pop, and ambient techno influences. It received a positive review from Select, which claimed that "just when you thought easy listening was played out in a welter of zany student discos, the elegantly multinational Gentle People come to reaffirm la dolce vita." The group has worked with artists such as Pizzicato Five, Fantastic Plastic Machine, and Deee-Lite. They attracted an international following in the UK, Japan, and US, where they appeared on various lounge and exotica compilations. Their work was also remixed by labelmates such as Aphex Twin and Luke Vibert.

Discography

Studio Albums
Soundtracks for Living (1997, Rephlex)
Simply Faboo (1999, Rephlex)

References

Musical groups established in 1995
Rephlex Records artists